Slobodan Nikić (Serbian Cyrillic: Слободан Никић; born 25 January 1983) is a Serbian professional water polo player. He is currently free agent and he is a long-standing member of the Serbia men's national water polo team. His most notable achievements with the national team are the gold medal from the Olympic Games in 2016, silver from the Olympic Games in 2004 and bronze from the Olympic Games 2012, three gold medals from the World Championships in 2005, 2009 and 2015, and five gold medals from the European Championships in 2003, 2006, 2012, 2014, and finally in 2016.

He is one of the most decorated players in the history of water polo, and the only water polo player in the world to have won 3 FINA World Championship gold medals, an all-time record as of 2018. In his club career, his most important achievements are the LEN Euroleague and the LEN Supercup won in 2010 with Pro Recco. Nikić is one of the most successful Serbian Olympians.

National career

2012 Samaridis Cup
From 9 to 11 January 2012. Nikić competed with his national team on the Greek island of Chios in the Samaridis Cup which was more a like preparation tournament for the upcoming 2012 European Championship held in Eindhoven. He and his team-mates finished second behind the Montenegrins on goal difference.

2012 Eindhoven
Nikić scored his first goal at the European Championship on 17 January against Germany in a second game which the Serbs won by 13–12. On 19 January, in a third game of the tournament, Nikić scored his second goal in a difficult 15–12 victory against the defending European champions Croatia. On 21 January in the fourth match, Nikić scored his third goal of the tournament for his national team in a routine victory against Romania 14–5. On 29 January, Nikić won the European Championship with his national team beating in the final Montenegro by 9–8. This was his third gold medal at the European Championships.

Honours

Club
Olympiacos
 Greek Championship: 2007, 2008, 2009
 Greek Cup: 2006, 2007, 2008, 2009

Pro Recco
 Serie A1: 2009–10, 2010–11
 Coppa Italia: 2009–10, 2010–11
 LEN Euroleague: 2009–10
 LEN Supercup: 2010

Ferencváros
 LEN Euro Cup: 2017–18
 Hungarian Championship (OB I): 2018

See also
 Serbia men's Olympic water polo team records and statistics
 Serbia and Montenegro men's Olympic water polo team records and statistics
 List of Olympic champions in men's water polo
 List of Olympic medalists in water polo (men)
 List of world champions in men's water polo
 List of World Aquatics Championships medalists in water polo

References

External links

 

1983 births
Living people
Sportspeople from Zrenjanin
Serbia and Montenegro male water polo players
Serbian male water polo players
Water polo centre forwards
Water polo players at the 2004 Summer Olympics
Water polo players at the 2012 Summer Olympics
Water polo players at the 2016 Summer Olympics
Medalists at the 2004 Summer Olympics
Medalists at the 2012 Summer Olympics
Medalists at the 2016 Summer Olympics
Olympic water polo players of Serbia and Montenegro
Olympic silver medalists for Serbia and Montenegro
Olympic gold medalists for Serbia in water polo
Olympic bronze medalists for Serbia in water polo
World Aquatics Championships medalists in water polo
European champions for Serbia and Montenegro
European champions for Serbia
Competitors at the 2009 Mediterranean Games
Mediterranean Games medalists in water polo
Mediterranean Games gold medalists for Serbia
Olympiacos Water Polo Club players
Serbian water polo coaches
Serbian expatriate sportspeople in Greece
Serbian expatriate sportspeople in Italy
Serbian expatriate sportspeople in Turkey